Magic City is the second solo studio album by MC Magic. It was released on May 9, 2006 via Nastyboy Records. Recording sessions took place at Nastyboy Studio. Production was handled by Roc A Dolla Beats, Angel Lopez, Big Nasty, Damizza, Destiny The Bandit, Nan Dogg, and MC Magic himself. It features guest appearances from Big Gemini, Chingo Bling, DJ Kane, Don Cisco, Guerilla Black, Herb G., Jay Tee, Junebug Slim, JX3, Kid Brown, Krystal Melody, Marcos Hernandez, Nichole, Sly, True Breed and Zig Zag. The album peaked at number 155 on the Billboard 200, number 60 on the Top R&B/Hip-Hop Albums and topped the Heatseekers Albums charts in the United States.

Track listing

Charts

References

External links

2006 albums
MC Magic albums
Albums produced by Damizza